This is a list of Major League Baseball players who died in wars. The player's team refers to the last team the person played for.

Spanish-American War

World War I

World War II
Of the more than 500 major league players who served in the military in World War II, two were killed.

Korean War
One Major Leaguer was killed in the Korean War.

References

Killed in wars
Major League Baseball
Major League Baseball